Ott Jud ("Ott the Jew") was a 15th-century Austrian martial arts master, specialized on grappling (Ringen).

The version of his treatise in Codex Lew states that he was a Christian baptized Jew.

Paulus Kal describes him as the wrestling master to the rulers of Austria, and names him as a member of the Society of Liechtenauer.

Ott's treatise on ringen is repeated throughout all of the early German treatise compilations and seems to have become the dominant work on the subject within the Liechtenauer tradition.

References 

 Lindholm, David and Svard, Peter. Sigmund Ringeck's Knightly Arts of Combat. Boulder, CO: Paladin Press, 2006. 
 Tobler, Christian Henry. In Saint George's Name: An Anthology of Medieval German Fighting Arts. Wheaton, IL: Freelance Academy Press, 2010. 
 Tobler, Christian Henry. Secrets of German Medieval Swordsmanship. Union City, Calif.: The Chivalry Bookshelf, 2001.

External links
 Ott Jud on wiktenauer.com

Jewish martial artists
German wrestlers
German people of Austrian-Jewish descent